Yu-Gi-Oh!, known in Japan as , is a Japanese anime series animated by Studio Gallop based on the Yu-Gi-Oh! manga series written by Kazuki Takahashi. It is the second anime adaptation of the manga following the 1998 anime television series produced by Toei Animation. The series revolves around a young high school boy named Yugi Muto who battles opponents in the Duel Monsters card game. The series begins from chapter 60 in volume 7 before loosely adapting the remaining chapters of the original manga by making story changes that conflict with the events of the manga canon.

Yu-Gi-Oh! originally aired in Japan on TV Tokyo from April 2000 to September 2004, running for 224 episodes; A remastered version, highlighting certain duels, began airing in Japan in February 2015. An English-language localization of the anime series was produced by 4Kids Entertainment, and aired in the United States from September 29, 2001, to June 10, 2006, on Kids' WB.

The series has since spawned its own metaseries. Duel Monsters would be succeeded by Yu-Gi-Oh! GX, Yu-Gi-Oh! 5D's, Yu-Gi-Oh! Zexal, Yu-Gi-Oh! Arc-V, Yu-Gi-Oh! VRAINS, Yu-Gi-Oh! Sevens, and Yu-Gi-Oh! Go Rush!!. Yu-Gi-Oh! Capsule Monsters, an American-produced miniseries, aired exclusively in the United States in 2006. Two films based on this anime series have also been produced: Yu-Gi-Oh! The Movie: Pyramid of Light and Yu-Gi-Oh!: Bonds Beyond Time'.

Plot overview

Season 1

The story follows Yugi Muto, a boy who completed an ancient Egyptian artifact known as the Millennium Puzzle, which led to him to inherit an alter-ego spirit. After defeating his rival, Seto Kaiba, in a game of Duel Monsters, Yugi is approached by Maximillion Pegasus, the creator of Duel Monsters, who uses the power of another Millennium Item, the Millennium Eye, to kidnap the soul of Yugi's grandfather. Joined by his friends Joey Wheeler (Katsuya Jonouchi), Tristan Taylor (Hiroto Honda), and Téa Gardner (Anzu Mazaki), Yugi enters Pegasus' Duelist Kingdom tournament in order to defeat Pegasus and free his grandfather's soul.

Season 2

Yugi learns that the spirit dwelling within him is a nameless Pharaoh from ancient Egyptian times, who doesn't remember anything of his past. Yugi enters Kaiba's Battle City tournament in order to obtain the three Egyptian God cards needed to unveil the Pharaoh's past. Along the way, Yugi encounters more Millennium Item wielders, including Marik Ishtar, the wielder of the Millennium Rod, and his elder sister Izhizu Ishtar who possesses the prophesying Millennium Necklace.

Season 3

The first twenty-four episodes of the season form an original story arc that sees Yugi and his friends get sucked into a virtual world run by Noah, the legitimate son of Kaiba's adoptive father, Gozaburo. After returning to the real world, the finals of the Battle City tournament commence.

Season 4

In a new, original story arc, the Order of Orichalcos drains the power from the Egyptian God cards and begins gathering souls in order to revive the ancient dragon, Leviathan. Yugi, Joey and Kaiba are each given a legendary dragon card to fight the Orichalcos and its leader, Dartz.

Season 5

In the final, original story arc, Yugi and his friends battle in the KaibaCorp Grand Championship. The rest of the season sees Ryo Bakura, the owner of the Millennium Ring, overcome by the dark spirit within the Ring. When Yugi and his friends go to Egypt, they find themselves sucked 5,000 years into the past, where Pharaoh must battle Bakura and his evil essence, Zorc the Dark One. After returning to the present day, Yugi and Pharaoh duel each other in the ultimate test.

Localization

In the 4Kids adaptation, character names, settings, and other aspects were changed. The show's visuals and sound effects were replaced, and a new music score was used. In addition to explaining these changes, 4Kids' senior vice president of digital media, Mark Kirk, also explained during an interview with Anime News Network that U.S. television broadcast laws under the FCC dictated that the "Duel Monster" cards in the anime were not allowed to look exactly like the real cards that are sold; otherwise, the show would legally be considered a infomercial rather than an animated television series, and thus the cost to air it during daytime hours would become exponentially higher.

Streaming
In July 2009, 4Kids announced plans to release the original, Japanese version of the anime series with subtitles on their YouTube channel. However, In August 2009, these episodes were removed due to legal issues with ADK (NAS' parent company) and Shunsuke Kazama, the Japanese voice of Yugi. On July 11, 2015, the Japanese version of the series began streaming on Crunchyroll. The news came over a week after an earlier announcement that streaming of subtitled episodes of Yu-Gi-Oh! GX'' would begin on August 1, 2015.

Cast

References

External links

 TV Tokyo Yu-Gi-Oh! Duel Monsters site (Japanese)
 NASinc. Yu-Gi-Oh! Duel Monsters site (Japanese) 
 
 
 

2000 anime television series debuts
Adventure anime and manga
Fantasy anime and manga
Funimation
Gallop (studio)
Odex
Science fiction anime and manga
TV Tokyo original programming
Yu-Gi-Oh!-related anime
Anime series based on manga
Television shows set in Japan
Television shows set in Egypt
Television shows set in the United States
Television shows set on islands
Japanese animated science fiction television series
Television series about parallel universes
Medialink
Television censorship in the United States